Marcinów  is a village in the administrative district of Gmina Krzyżanów, within Kutno County, Łódź Voivodeship, in central Poland.

In 2005 the village had a population of 80.

References
Gmina Krzyżanów official website

Villages in Kutno County